Saissac is a commune in the Aude department in southern France.

Geography
The village is perched in the foothills of the Montagne Noire (Black Mountain) at an altitude of 467 m and has views of the Vernassonne Gorge as well as the valley plain which stretches between Carcassonne and Castelnaudary.

History
The name of the village first appeared in the 10th century and originates from the Gallo-Romain Saxiago.  The history of the village is strongly linked to the Château built in the 10th century.

Population

Sights
Near Saissac, there is a transmitter for broadcasting messages to submerged submarines, the La Regine Transmitter. Its mast was built in 1973 and is 330 metres tall – taller than Eiffel Tower.
 Arboretum du Lampy

See also
Communes of the Aude department

References

Communes of Aude
Aude communes articles needing translation from French Wikipedia